Mary Moseley (1878 – 1961) was a newspaper editor, and then owner of the Nassau Guardian for 48 years in The Bahamas. At the time the island was a British colony.

The daughter of Alfred Edwin Moseley, Mary was also the granddaughter of Edwin Charles Moseley, who founded the Nassau Guardian. She was educated at the Church High School in Nassau and by private tutor.

Editor 
The Nassau Guardian first appeared on November 23, 1844 to support the anti-slavery views of its founder.

Mary Moseley became editor and manager of the Nassau Guardian following the deaths of her father, Alfred Edwin Moseley, and shortly thereafter her brother Percy in 1904. Reportedly, she had been appointed to the editor's post "on a 'temporary basis' until a suitable male could be found to edit and manage the publishing business." In 1907, she officially became owner of the business and served as the publication's editor and owner for 48 years. 

During World War I, Moseley went to England to advocate for war survivors from the West Indies and The Bahamas. During her time abroad, Mary's brother Daniel ran the enterprise so she could return to her editorial duties on her return.

Readership wasn't large, averaging only about 300 readers a day with topics primarily covering social and legislative issues. For example, she was rigorous in covering the House of Assembly issues. In fact, the paper's day-to-day financial foundation was largely built on the government printing contracts that Moseley was able to win using her influential contacts.

While looking for an editorial successor, Moseley identified a nephew, Australian Doyle Moseley, to take her place. Before the start of World War II, Doyle traveled to Nassau and joined the staff for a short time before enlisting in The Royal Air Force to fight. Unfortunately, Doyle was killed in the war during a raid over France.

Mary Moseley continued her work at the paper until 1952 when she sold the enterprise to a group of Nassau businessmen. From that time on, she continued to serve as an editorial adviser.  

According to the Nassau Guardian, she died on January 19, 1961, at the age of 81. Other sources say she died in 1960.

Other activities 
In 1926, Moseley published the first edition of The Bahamas Handbook featuring the island's history, geography and society. 

She served as a trustee for the Nassau Public Library and Museum; she later became chair of the trusteeship committee.

Honours
She was named a Member of the Order of the British Empire by King George V.

References 

1878 births
1960 deaths
Bahamian newspaper editors
Women newspaper editors
Bahamian newspaper publishers (people)
Members of the Order of the British Empire